The Chartered Institute of Taxation of Nigeria (CITN) is a professional organization in Nigeria whose members are certified as qualified tax practitioners or administrators.

Organization

The CITN was formed in February 1982 and chartered by the Federal Government of Nigeria by the enabling Act No. 76 of 1992. Members of the institute may be Accounting, Legal or other professionals who have obtained the relevant tax expertise. The institute provides training and conducts examinations to determine eligibility. The CITN offers an Advanced Diploma in International Taxation to CITN members who work in international tax. The CITN has been criticized for not providing enough training to members at subsidized rates.

Affiliations

The CITN cooperates with the United Kingdom-based Chartered Institute of Taxation. CITN is also affiliated with the South African Institute of Tax Practitioners and the West African Union of Tax Institutes. The CITN has a working relationship with the Association of National Accountants of Nigeria (ANAN) to promote XBRL recommendations and specifications in Nigeria. The CITN is a member of the Financial Reporting Council of Nigeria. The CITN is also a member of the International Tax Directors Forum (ITDF) and the Association of African Tax Institutes (AATI).

Council Members (2021/2022)

Council members of 2021/2022:

 President – Adesina Isaac Adedayo FCTI
 Vice President – Samuel Olushola AGBELUYI FCTI
 Deputy Vice President – Innocent Chinyere OHAGWA FCTI 
 Honorary Treasurer – Simon Nwanmaghyi Kato FCTI
 Immediate Past President – Dame Gladys Olajumoke Simplice, FCTI
 Exco Member – Dr. Justina Adaku Okoror FCTI
 Members: Dr. Titilayo Eni-Itan Fowokan FCTI, Prof. Godwin Emmanuel Oyedokun FCTI, Kolawole Ezekiel Babarinde FCTI, Ruth Oluwabamike Arokoyo FCTI, Cecilia Odefenare Odibo FCTI, Taopheeq Ade-Tunde Oretuga FCTI, Isola Olurotimi Akingabde FCTI, Sheriff Adeyemi Sanni FCTI, Emeke Monday Nwabuzor FCTI 
 Representing CITN in the House of Representatives – The Honourable Mahuta Babangida Ibrahim FCTI 
 Representing the Executive Chairman of Federal Inland Revenue Service – Abba Kabir FCTI
 Representative of Tertiary Education (Universities) – Prof. Mohammad Akaro Mainoma FCTI
 Representative of Tertiary Education (Polytechnics) – Adamu Bello Lawal ACTI
 Representatives of Joint Tax Board: Aminu Darabati Abdulmumin FCTI and Monday John Onyeme FCTI
 Representative of Federal Ministry of Finance – Hajia Fatima Z. Hayatu
 Representative of Federal Ministry of Education – Adegboye Adebayo ACTI
 Representative of North-Eastern Region – Ali Manga Bulama FCTI
 Legal Advisors: Chukwuemeka Eze FCTI, Abiodun A. Olatunji SAN ACTI, Layi Babatunde SAN FCTI, Charles Amajuoritse Ajuyah SAN ACTI, Prof. Abdulmumini Bala Ahmed ACTI

In the news

In March 2011, Prince Rasaq Adekunle Quadri, former President of the CITN, was elected the first President of the West African Union of Tax Institutes (WAUTI). WAUTI is the umbrella body of tax Institutes in the region. In May 2011, Sebastian Owuama, President of Institute of Chartered Accountants of Nigeria, attended the annual tax conference of the CITN in Abuja where he called for an end to the squabble between ICAN and the CITN. In June 2011, Sunday Jegede, president of the CITN, was elected first President of the Association of African Tax Institutes (AATI). The AATI was formally inaugurated in South Africa in October 2011 during the Annual Tax Conference of the South Africa Institute of Taxation.

References

Economy of Nigeria
Organizations established in 1982
Professional associations based in Nigeria
Tax practitioner associations
Organizations based in Lagos
1982 establishments in Nigeria